Alessandro Sala may refer to:
 Alessandro Sala (composer)
 Alessandro Sala (footballer)